Eoin O'Broin, better known by his stage name Noisestorm (born 1 October 1995), is an Irish DJ and music producer. He is best known for his song "Crab Rave", which peaked at 14 on Billboards Dance/Electronic Songs chart.

Early life
Noisestorm was born Eoin O'Broin on 1 October 1995 in Dublin, Ireland.

Career
On 1 April 2018, O'Broin released his song "Crab Rave" on Monstercat as an April Fools' Day joke. The song gained popularity as an internet meme, with the song debuting at number 36 on Billboards "Hot Dance/Electronic Songs" category. Following "Crab Rave", O'Broin released the song "Breakout" with English hip hop group Foreign Beggars. Critics praised the release, with Dancing Astronaut praising the mixture of rap with the synths and drops.

Discography

Extended plays

As a featured artist

Charted singles

Other singles

References

Living people
Irish DJs
Musicians from County Dublin
Irish music
Electronic dance music musicians
Breakbeat musicians
Dubstep musicians
Monstercat artists
1995 births